The Vištupis is a river of  Kėdainiai district municipality, Kaunas County, central Lithuania.

The river flows into the Smilga, which is a tributary of the Nevėžis, in turn a tributary of the Neman.

References

Rivers of Lithuania
Kėdainiai District Municipality